Ernest Leland Norman (November 11, 1904 – December 6, 1971) was an American spiritual leader best known for co-founded the Unarius Science of Life and the Unarius Educational Foundation, which later became known as Unarius Academy of Science.

Early life 
Norman claimed to be a genius child prodigy, who at age 7 constructed his first microscope using parts from his telescope, and was very good at math as a teenager. At age 17, he and his family moved to California, where he took evening classes at an unnamed school. At age 23 he married, and it was during this time when Norman began to experiment with clairvoyance, palmistry, and fortune telling.

Before starting the grassroots work for Unarius, Ernest Norman worked for the Borderlands Sciences Research Association as a contributing editor for the Round Robin journal, and also worked as a minister for a Spiritualist church for 15 years.

Unarius Science of Life
In February 1954, Norman met his future wife, Ruth E. Norman at a spiritualist convention in Los Angeles. They claim that at this convention a clairvoyant noticed three white bearded men following Norman with massive books. Ernest and Ruth claimed these were the spirits of Elisha, Ezra, and Enoch carrying the books that Ernest was going to write in his current lifetime. 

After their initial meeting at the convention, Norman "channeled" and wrote a book on poetry and prose called The Elysium (published in 1956), which would later be followed by its sequel, The Anthenium (published in 1964). With Ruth's assistance, Norman gave a 12-week lecture called "Pathway to the Stars" in Los Angeles, where he described in detail how energy functions, what he saw in the celestial worlds, psychic protection, and parapsychology. In this lecture, Norman claimed that the people of planet Earth were being guided and watched over by a large fraternal brotherhood called Unarius, which was formerly known as Shamballah or the White Brotherhood on Earth, and that any human being could make contact with these "Higher Beings" (sometimes also called Space Brothers, "Brothers", or "Brothers of the Light") because everyone is capable of using psychic abilities. Eventually, the Pathway to the Stars lecture course was compiled with further articles and printed as a book entitled the Infinite Concept of Cosmic Creation. The new articles, which included an advanced course based on the initial Pathway to the Stars lecture, further detailed the interdimensional science that Ernest Norman was trying to convey during his lecture series. 

It was during this time Norman took on the moniker of the Unarius Moderator, or simply the Moderator. Unarius was officially formed as a nonprofit corporation in the state of California in 1957, as the Unarius - Science of Life.

The Normans and their students put together a series of testimonials of various past-life relivings and spiritual healing that they claimed had occurred because of their tutelage under Ernest Norman. One such claim included that Norman was on Earth in ancient Jerusalem as Jesus, and his students had been his followers and enemies, reincarnated once more to heal themselves of the karma they accumulated in that lifetime.

Students also believed that Norman was overshadowed by an Archangel named Raphiel in his earthly incarnations on Earth and in previous lifetimes in other worlds. Archangel Raphiel should not be confused with the biblical Archangel Raphael, as the title of "Archangel" within the vernacular of Unarius means "Supreme Master", and the name Raphiel is an acronym for "“Radiant Absolute Pure Healing Infinite Eternal Light”. The Unariun Archangel Raphiel is part of a hierarchy of Higher Beings who oversee the development of the universe, but do not surpass "God" (called the Infinite Creative Intelligence). The revelations of the Archangels came about when Ruth E. Norman took over as leader of Unarius.

Death

Norman died in 1971 due to bilateral viral pneumonia and influenza.

Bibliography
Ernest Norman wrote twenty books in his lifetime that covered theoretical physics, spirituality, philosophy, theology, extraterrestrial life, sociology, and poetry. Norman also authored articles further emphasizing the interdimensional hypothesis he was trying to teach, and answered letters from his students that have been archived at the Unarius Academy of Science. 

The first book he wrote, The Truth About Mars, gives an account of Norman meeting the Martian ambassador, a being named Nur El, and traveling to the underground cities of Mars in his astral body. 
 Truth About Mars
 The Infinite Concept of Cosmic Creation
 Infinite Perspectus
 Tempus Invictus
 Tempus Procedium
 Tempus Interludium Vol. 1
 Tempus Interludium Vol. 11 (Featuring Atoms to Astronauts)
 Cosmic Continuum
 Infinite Contact 
 Voice of Venus (1956)
 Voice of Eros
 Voice of Hermes
 Voice of Orion
 Voice of Muse, Elysium, Unarius 
 Little Red Box

Poetry 

 The Elysium (1956)
 The Anthenium (1964)

See also
New Age Spirituality
Spiritism
Theosophy
Biocentrism
Fourth Dimension
Quantum Physics
Interdimensional being
Metaphysics
Multiverse
Ontology
List of people who have claimed to be Jesus

References

External links
Unarius Academy of Science Official Homepage
Founders of Unarius via Unarius Academy of Science
Unarius Academy of Science Facebook
Unarius33 YouTube Page
Unariun Wisdom Homepage
Unarius Community Homepage

1904 births
1971 deaths
Paranormal investigators
New Age spiritual leaders
American religious leaders
Founders of new religious movements
Place of birth missing